Harry Scott Freeman (7 February 1876 – 5 October 1968) was a field hockey player, who won a gold medal with the England team at the 1908 Summer Olympics in London.

References

External links
 

1876 births
1968 deaths
English male field hockey players
English Olympic medallists
Field hockey players at the 1908 Summer Olympics
Olympic gold medallists for Great Britain
Olympic field hockey players of Great Britain
British male field hockey players
Olympic medalists in field hockey
People from Staines-upon-Thames
Medalists at the 1908 Summer Olympics